Klender Station (KLD) is a railway station located in Jatinegara Kaum, Pulo Gadung, East Jakarta, Indonesia. The station, which is located at an altitude of +10 m, is included in the Jakarta Operational Area I and only serves KRL Commuterline trips.

Building and layout

This station is one of the railway stations whose platforms were only able to accommodate short KRL trains; the platform of this station can only accommodate 6 train cars, while the remaining 2 cars do not have a platform, so the passengers who will get off at this station shift to other cars that have platforms. However, now the platform of this station has been extended so that it can accommodate a series of 12 KRL train cars.

Since 26 October 2018, this station has used a new building with a futuristic modern minimalist architecture which is located near the old building. This relocation changed the layout of the railway track, which was originally flanked by two side platforms into one island platform between the two railway tracks. The old station building, which was once a fire has been torn down since construction took place.

Services
The following is a list of train services at the Klender Station.

Passenger services 
 KAI Commuter
  Cikarang Loop Line (Full Racket)
  Cikarang Loop Line (Half Racket), to / (via  and ) and

Supporting transportation

Incidents 

 On 19 May 2017, Klender Station was on fire. KRL passengers were detained at Bekasi Station for 20 minutes. As a result of the fire at this station, temporarily all train and KRL services were stopped for an indefinite period of time and continued immediately.

Gallery

References

External links 

East Jakarta
Railway stations in Jakarta